Keizan Jōkin (1268–1325), also known as Taiso Jōsai Daishi, is considered to be the second great founder of the Sōtō school of Zen in Japan.

Keizan and his disciples are credited with beginning the spread of Sōtō Zen throughout Japan, away from the cloistered monastic practice characteristic of Dōgen's Eihei-ji and towards a more popular religion that appealed to all levels of Japanese society. Keizan founded several temples during his lifetime, most notably Yōkō-ji and Daihonzan Sōji-ji (founded on the Noto Peninsula and moved to Tsurumi-ku, Yokohama in 1911). Today Sōji-ji and Eihei-ji stand together as the two principal Sōtō Zen training centers in Japan.

Biography

Youth and Zen-training
Keizan spent the first eight years growing up under the care of his grandmother, Myōchi, who was one of Great Master Dōgen's first supporters on his return from China. Keizan always acknowledged a great debt to this grandmother by dedicating the Kannon shrine at the temple of Yōkō-ji to her memory.

Keizan also praised his mother very highly in his autobiography, and even said that his mother's wishes and her constant prayers to Kannon had enabled him to become a monk, receive the Dharma transmission, and become one of the Sōtō Zen Ancestors. His mother had become abbess of a Sōtō monastery, Jōju-ji  and was a teacher in her own right. It seems that his mother had a huge influence on him, both as an example of someone who encouraged the teaching of Buddhism to women and through her emphasis on the power of Kannon, the bodhisattva of compassion.

Keizan first became a novice, at the age of eight, at Eihei-ji, under the tutelage of Gikai, and he was formally ordained at age thirteen by Koun Ejō. He reached the stage of "non-backsliding" while training with Jakuen, and received dharma transmission from Tettsū Gikai at the age of thirty-two. All of this was recorded in his autobiography; he was the first Japanese Zen monk to describe his own life.

Sōji-ji
While Keizan is often spoken of as the fourth-generation Dharma heir of Dōgen, many English sources erroneously assume that Keizan held the abbacy of Eihei-ji—but he never did so: the fourth-generation abbot of Eihei-ji was Giun, who replaced Gikai after the latter was forced out of Eihei-ji in what is known as the sandai sōron. Keizan did succeed Gikai as the second abbot of Daijō-ji, in present-day Kanazawa.

However, Keizan's major accomplishment, which gave rise to his status as "second patriarch" of Sōtō Zen, was the founding of Sōji-ji, which soon overshadowed Eihei-ji as the principal Sōtō temple. Sōji-ji eventually became the institutional head of four regional networks with several thousand temples under them. By 1589, the imperial court recognized  Sōji-ji as the head temple of the Sōtō school, above Eihei-ji; the two temples remained rivals for imperial support, but by the time of the Meiji Restoration in 1872, they had arrived at a truce, acknowledged in the characterization that the Sōtō school followed “the maxims of the founding Patriarch, Dōgen, and the aspirations of the late teacher, Keizan.”

Death
Keizan died at Yōkō-ji on the twenty-ninth day of the ninth month of 1325, at the age of fifty-eight years. Meihō Sotetsu (1277–1350) became abbot of Yōkō-ji, and Gasan Jōseki abbot of Sōji-ji; both of those lines of Dharma Transmission remain important in Japanese Sōtō Zen. (Jiyu-Kennett 2002: 97)

Support for training women

Apart from extending the appeal of Sōtō Zen to the rural population, Keizan made efforts to encourage the training of women in Buddhism. Keizan, in his autobiography, gave much credit to his grandmother and mother; he regarded their support as vital to his own training, and this must have influenced him.

His mother, Ekan, founded two temples, Hōō-ji and Jōju-ji, the latter as a convent of which she was abbess. Keizan's veneration of the bodhisattva Guanyin (Kannon, in Japanese)—who is customarily represented as female in East Asian Buddhism—stemmed from or was enhanced by his mother's devotion to her. Around 1323 or 1324, Keizan named Myōshō, his cousin (his mother's niece), abbess of Hōō-ji. Following his mother's example of teaching Buddhism to women, Keizan gave the first dharma transmission to a Sōtō nun to his student, Ekyū; Keizan had helped Ekyū by giving her copies of Dōgen's writings translated into Japanese, making them easier for her to follow than Chinese.

Keizan had a nunnery constructed near Yōkō-ji (eventually making Sonin the abbess) and ensured that funds were allocated for its continuing survival (Faure 2000: 42). It is believed that five monasteries for female monks (nuns) were established by Keizan (Matsuo 2010: 143). He also named Sonin, the wife of the original donor of Yōkō-ji, as a Dharma Heir (Faure 2000: 44); Keizan claimed that Sonin was the reincarnation of Myōchi, his grandmother.

Writings
Keizan was the author of a number of works, including "Zazen Yōjinki" and, most famously, the Denkōroku (Transmission of the Light), which is a series of fifty-one sermons detailing the Sōtō lineage from Gautama Buddha through the Indian Ancestors from Bodhidharma and the Chinese Ancestors, and finally to the Japanese Ancestors Dōgen and his immediate successor at Eihei-ji, Ejō.

Legacy 

Keidō Chisan Kohō Zenji, abbot of Sōji-ji in the 1960s, wrote in Sōtō Zen:

Notes

References
 Zen is Eternal Life, P. T. N. Jiyu Kennett, Shasta Abbey Press, 4th edition, 2000, 
 The Wild White Goose, P. T. N. Jiyu Kennett, Shasta Abbey Press, 2nd edition, 2002, 
 Nearman, Hubert, trans. (2001). Keizan Zenji, Denkoroku, Shasta Abbey Press, 2001, 
 Visions of Power, Bernard Faure, Phyllis Brooks, Published by Princeton University Press, 2000 , 
 Sōtō Zen in Medieval Japan, William M. Bodiford, University of Hawaii Press, 1993, 
 Sōtō Zen, Keidō Chisan Kohō Zenji, originally published 1960 Sōji-ji Temple, Yokohama Japan, . Available from Shasta Abbey Press, www.shastaabbey.org.
 History of Japanese Buddhism, Matsuo Kenji, Global Oriental, 2010, 
 McRae, John; Tokiwa, Gishin; Yoshida, Osamu; Heine, Steven, trans. (2005). Zen texts, Berkeley, Calif.: Numata Center for Buddhist Translation and Research (Advice on the practice of Zazen by Keizan)

 
Soto Zen Buddhists
Zen Buddhist abbots
Japanese Zen Buddhists
1268 births
1325 deaths
Kamakura period Buddhist clergy